Are You Scared? is a 2006 American horror film directed by Andy Hurst, and released by Revolver Entertainment. It stars Carlee Avers, Brad Ashten, and Soren Bowie. An unrelated sequel, called Are You Scared 2, was released in 2009.

Plot
Six young people wake up in an abandoned building, with no idea of what is going on or how they got there. A mysterious figure speaks to them over a PA system and tells them that they are on a game show called Are You Scared?  They will have to face their deepest fears in order to win the contest.  However, their challenges are real – and deadly.  The show involves several "contests", each of which result in the grisly deaths of the contestants, including death by acid, explosion, shotgun, hungry rats, strangulation, power drill, and decapitation.

Cast
 Alethea Kutscher as Kelly
 Erin Consalvi as Cherie
 Brad Ashten as Brandon
 Carlee Avers as Laura
 Kariem Markbury as Jason
 Soren Bowie as Dylan
 Eric Francis as Det. Jay Bowman
 Jennifer Cozza as Christine Robinson
 Brent Fidler as Shadow Man/Kelly's Father
 Madison Petrich as Tara

Reception
Professional critiques for Are You Scared? have been predominantly negative. Scott Foy called the film "Saw for Dummies" and a "shameless knock-off" of the more successful Saw series. He ended his review with the statement, "No, I was not scared." Slasherpool, however, was "surprised by how decent it turned out to be," citing it as "idiotic" but "mildly entertaining," "as far as rip-offs go."  Steve Anderson of AcidLogic.com called it "a mixed bag of entertainment options" that adds a small amount of originality by including a reality show aspect with its influence from Saw.

References

External links

 
 

2006 films
2006 horror films
American horror films
American independent films
2000s English-language films
Films directed by Andy Hurst
2000s American films